88th NBR Awards
Best Film: 
Manchester by the Sea

The 88th National Board of Review Awards, honoring the best in film for 2016, were announced on November 29, 2016.

Top 10 Films
Films listed alphabetically except top, which is ranked as Best Film of the Year:

Manchester by the Sea
Arrival
Hacksaw Ridge
Hail, Caesar!
Hell or High Water
Hidden Figures
La La Land
Moonlight
Patriots Day
Silence
Sully

Top Foreign Films
Elle
The Handmaiden
Julieta
Land of Mine
Neruda

Top Documentaries 
De Palma
The Eagle Huntress
Gleason
Life, Animated
Miss Sharon Jones!

Top Independent Films 
20th Century Women
Captain Fantastic
Creative Control
Eye in the Sky
The Fits
Green Room
Hello, My Name Is Doris
Krisha
Morris from America
Sing Street

Winners

Best Film:
Manchester by the Sea

Best Director:
Barry Jenkins, Moonlight

Best Actor:
Casey Affleck, Manchester by the Sea

Best Actress:
Amy Adams, Arrival

Best Supporting Actor:
Jeff Bridges, Hell or High Water

Best Supporting Actress:
Naomie Harris, Moonlight

Best Original Screenplay:
Kenneth Lonergan, Manchester by the Sea

Best Adapted Screenplay:
Jay Cocks and Martin Scorsese, Silence

Best Animated Feature:
Kubo and the Two Strings

Breakthrough Male Performance:
Lucas Hedges, Manchester by the Sea

Breakthrough Female Performance:
Royalty Hightower, The Fits

Best Directorial Debut:
Trey Edward Shults, Krisha

Best Foreign Language Film:
The Salesman

Best Documentary:
O.J.: Made in America

Best Ensemble:
Hidden Figures

Spotlight Award:
Creative collaboration of Peter Berg and Mark Wahlberg.

NBR Freedom of Expression:
Cameraperson

References

National Board of Review Awards
2016 film awards
2016 in American cinema